Bramshall is a village and former civil parish, now in the parish of Uttoxeter Rural, in the East Staffordshire district, in the county of Staffordshire, England. It is to the west of Uttoxeter. It has a new housing estate to the north of it. In 1931 the parish had a population of 173.

History
It was sometimes known as Broomshull, Bromshall etc., (Domesday Book: Branselle) and there was an area to the south called Little Bromshall. It was a possession of the families of Stafford, Bagot and Erdeswyk. The sister and heiress of Robert III de Stafford (d.1193/4), of Stafford Castle was 
Millicent de Stafford, wife of Harvey I Bagot (d.1214). Whilst her elder son was the ancestor of the Earls of Stafford and the Dukes of Buckingham, her younger son was William Stafford of "Broomshull", ancestor of several other prominent Stafford lines, most notably Stafford of Hooke, Stafford of Southwick and Stafford of Grafton.

Although Bramshall is relatively old much of it dates from the late 1990s when several new housing estates were built.

There was a military explosives storage area to the West of Bramshall, with 11 sheds approximately 75 feet by 200 feet, served by rail.  It was used to store US explosives and was closed before 1971.

Governance
Bramshall is part of the Uttoxeter Rural civil parish.

Bramshall is part of the Abbey ward in East Staffordshire and is represented by the Conservative Colin Whittaker. And the Uttoxeter Rural ward in Staffordshire County council and is represented by Philip Atkins who is also Conservative.

Bramshall is part of the Burton constituency in the House of Commons. In Europe it was part of the West Midlands constituency and was represented by 6 MEPs.

On 1 April 1934 the parish was abolished and merged with Uttoxeter Rural, part also went to Uttoxeter.

Public services
Water and sewage services are provided by South Staffordshire Water and the Sewage Treatment Works is in Uttoxeter. The distribution network operator for electricity is Western Power Distribution.

Bramshall uses the Stoke-on-Trent (ST) Postcode and the Postal Town is Uttoxeter.

The nearest police and fire stations are in Uttoxeter. Bramshall is part of Staffordshire Police, Staffordshire Fire and Rescue Service and West Midlands Ambulance Service.

Education
Bramshall uses the Uttoxeter middle school system. There are no schools or other educational institutions in the village and the nearest schools are all in Uttoxeter. Primary school students usually attend St Mary's first school, middle school children attend Oldfields Hall Middle School and senior school children attend Thomas Alleyne's High School, all of them being in Uttoxeter. Also, some attend the Catholic school, St Joseph's, before going on to attend Painsley in Cheadle. The local Further education colleges in the area are Burton College and Stafford College.

Transport
Bramshall previously had its own railway station on the Crewe to Derby Line and was the site of a junction with the Stafford and Uttoxeter Railway that closed to passengers in 1939. The Crewe to Derby line still passes the village and the nearest station is Uttoxeter

The nearest airport is East Midlands.

Media
The local newspaper covering the area is the Uttoxeter Echo

The local BBC Radio station is BBC Radio Stoke. Independent Local radio in the area includes Signal 1 and Touch FM.

Bramshall is covered by the Central ITV and BBC West Midlands TV regions both broadcast from Sutton Coldfield transmitting station.

See also
Listed buildings in Uttoxeter Rural

References

External links

Villages in Staffordshire
Former civil parishes in Staffordshire
Borough of East Staffordshire